Stonekeep: Bones of the Ancestors is a video game by American developer Alpine Studios and published by Interplay Entertainment for the Nintendo Wii in 2012. The game is the second game released in the Stonekeep series, although it is not Stonekeep 2, a game that was cancelled after five years of development, but rather a new game based on the original. The game was released through the WiiWare online distribution system, Interplay's second game of the kind, after MDK2 HD, to positive sales, but largely negative critical reception.

Plot
The game once again focuses on the ancient city of Stonekeep, which was saved by the protagonist's ancestors after being ruined by a dark god's magick. With the city once again in danger, the protagonist must step up to defend his home.

Gameplay
The game allows for players to wield melee weapons to fight enemies in addition to using projectiles. "Majick" is also available to use to attack enemies, allowing players to cast compound spells. After defeating monsters, players are given the ability to take loot. The player travels through seven different dungeons in which they must avoid traps, fight monsters and use a variety of weapons and majick. The player is also allowed to pick a companion with whom he can save Stonekeep.

Reception

Despite positive sales, the game garnered overwhelmingly negative reception. Nintendo Life criticized its "laughably outdated" graphics, story, and overly complicated gameplay being simply a "pain to play". The reviewer would recommend the player pick up the original version of Stonekeep, which he would claim to be a better buy. GameCola too panned the game, bashing it's "cartoony" look and sluggish controls, with the graphics being compared to that of a game released on a Sega Saturn.

References

External links

Stonekeep: Bones of the Ancestors at GameRankings
Stonekeep: Bones of the Ancestors at Nintendo's official site

2012 video games
Interplay Entertainment games
North America-exclusive video games
Role-playing video games
WiiWare games
Wii games
Wii-only games
Video games developed in the United States